Aschenbrener is an English-speaking form of the origin German name Aschenbrenner. Notable people with the surname include:

 George Aschenbrener (1881–1952), US participant of the 1904 Summer Olympics
 Robert W. Aschenbrener (1920–2009), US World War II flying ace

See also
 Aschenbrenner

Surnames of German origin
German-language surnames